Old Boy (Chinese: 老男孩 ) is a 2018 Chinese television series starring Liu Ye and Ariel Lin alongside Lei Jiayin and Hu Xianxu. It aired on Hunan TV from March 4 to April 19, 2018.

Synopsis
A handsome commercial airline pilot Wu Zheng (Liu Ye) and a beautiful but temperamental, elite private school English teacher Lin Xiao Ou (Lin Yichen) meet by chance in Australia in rather unpleasant circumstances. Their relationship starts off on the wrong foot but the fate will make them cross paths many times.

Cast
Liu Ye as Wu Zheng
Ariel Lin as Lin Xiao'ou 
Lei Jiayin as Shi Fei
Hu Xianxu as Xiao Han
Guo Shutong as Ye Zi
Wang Yanzhi as Fei Wenli
Li Jianyi as Li Liqun
Ni Hongjie as Ding Fangru 
Wang Ding as Li Lei
Zhou Qi as Zhou Zhou 
Wang Ce as Zhou Zhengyi
Wei Wei as Ye Xin
Zeng Li as Xiao Wei
Chi Feng as Wang Xiujuan
Liang Jingxian as Wang Shan
Yang Xizi as Li Keman 
Tan Kai as Captain Zheng
Li Guangjie as Xiao Yue
Lin Peng as Lu Dazhi 
Hua Mingwei as Principal Ou 
Zhou Xianxin as Wu Shuying 
Li Jialin as Aunty Wen
Hu Kun as Xiao Qi 
Zhang Lan as Mother Ou 
Liu Qi as Wang Yifu

Soundtrack

Production 
The series is directed by Yu Cuihua (Love O2O, Eternal Love), written by Mobao Feibao (Scarlet Heart, My Sunshine) and produced by  Xiong Xiaoling (Love O2O, My Sunshine). Other notable cast members include Teng Huatao (Dwelling Narrowness, Fu Chen) as its executive producer and Di Kun (To Be a Better Man) as its artistic director.

Tangjia Sanshao, the original author of the novel, acts as the promotional ambassador of the series. This is the first cross-over collaboration between entertainment media (television) and literary work.

The series was filmed in Shanghai, Beijing and New York from April to August 2017.

Awards and nominations

References

Hunan Television dramas
Chinese romance television series
2018 Chinese television series debuts
2018 Chinese television series endings